Statistics for the 2001 season of the Lao League.

Overview
Banks won the championship, which was arranged on a group stage. Two pools of six played each other with the top two qualifying for the semi-finals.

Group stage

Pool 1
Banks (Finished first in Group)
Interior Ministry (Finished second in Group)
Luang Prabang Province
Education Ministry
Army

Pool 2
Champassak Province (Finished first in Group)   
Vientiane municipality (Finished first in Group) 
Industry Ministry
Khammuan Province
Savannakhet Province

Semi-finals

Third-place match

Final

References

Lao Premier League seasons
1
Laos
Laos